The Kerner grape is an aromatic white grape variety. It was bred in 1929 by August Herold by crossing Trollinger (a red variety also known as Schiava grossa or Vernatsch) and Riesling. Herold was working at a plant breeding station in Lauffen in the Württemberg region of Germany. This station belonged to a state breeding institute headquartered in Weinsberg. It received varietal protection and was released for general cultivation in 1969.

Kerner is named in honour of a poet and physician from Swabia, Justinus Kerner, whose works included songs and poetry on wine. Kerner lived from 1818 to his death in Weinsberg.

The trend since the mid-1990s is that German plantations of Kerner decrease, just as the case for all other "new breeds" of white varieties, such as Müller-Thurgau and Bacchus. For a while around 1995 it was in fact the third most planted variety in Germany after Riesling and Müller-Thurgau.

Kerner is most commonly planted in the German regions of Palatinate, Rheinhessen, Mosel, and Württemberg, but it is also grown in Austria (Styria), Switzerland, the island of Hokkaido in Japan, Old Mission Peninsula in Michigan, and the Italian province of South Tyrol. It was introduced into South Tyrol in the early 1970s and awarded Denominazione di origine controllata (DOC) status in 1993.

Plant

Vigour
Kerner has a good vigour and generally it is grown on a medium vigorous rootstock like SO4.

Leaf
The leaf is medium-sized with a dark green blade and a dentated leaf edge.

Grape
The grape is medium-sized and quite compact.
Kerner buds late and so the shoots mature well and show a considerable resistance to cold winters, it can survive at temperature of – 10 °C.

Compared to Riesling, Kerner can be grown in less favourable conditions and has bigger yields. The ripening is in early October.

This vine grows on all types of soil, in general is grown on slopes and on sunny slopes it can be grown up to altitudes of 800–900 metres.

This crossing isn’t sensitive to downy mildew, powdery mildew and botrytis, but in bad weather conditions these diseases can cause some problems.  There aren’t pest problems because in these cold conditions they can't develop.

Wine

Color
Transparent straw yellow, sometimes with golden reflex.

Aromas
Pronounced varietal bouquet, often with a Muscat tone; fresh aromas offer a tasty blend of mixed white fruits, with hints of apple, grapefruit and a tropical whiff of mango.

Taste
Resembling Riesling, Kerner wines are fresh, racy and fruity, but yet milder in acidity and showing more body.

Synonyms
Kerner is known under the following synonyms: Herold Triumpf, Herold Weiss, Schiava Grossa x Riesling Renano WE 25/30, Trollinger x Riesling Renano WE S 25/30, WE S 2530, Weinsberg S 25-30, Weißer Herold.

Offspring
The variety Kernling is a mutation of Kerner. Three varieties have been created by crossing Kerner with other varieties: Juwel and Silcher are both Kerner x Silvaner (but not identical, since each seed plant acquires a different combination of genetic material from its parents) and Roter Milan is Kerner x Pinot noir.

References

White wine grape varieties